This is a list of characters that appear in the Uta no Prince-sama franchise.

Main characters

 (anime)
Haruka is a 15-year-old girl whose name and class can be selected by the player. She enrolls into Saotome Academy to pursue her dream of becoming a music composer and create a song for her idol, HAYATO, but she eventually becomes the sole producer for Starish. In the anime, Haruka has lived with her grandmother and has no music experience prior to enrolling into Saotome Academy.

STARISH

STARISH (stylized as ST☆RISH) is a Japanese idol boy band composed of students from Saotome Academy. Beginning in the second game, Uta no Prince-sama: Debut and the anime, the students were assigned to the group, with Haruka as their producer. Each member serves as possible love interests for Haruka, depending on whether the player decides to join Class A or Class S. The group's name is an acronym of the members' names. Initially starting out with six, Cecil is added to the group at the end of the first game and the anime's second season, Uta no Prince-sama: Maji Love 2000%.

 Otoya is a student in Class A. He's a friendly and positive person who enjoys singing. He shares a room with Tokiya. Otoya is an orphan, as his mother supposedly died in a plane crash, and he has never met his father. Otoya decided to become an idol because he heard his father was one. He plays the guitar.

 Tokiya is a student in Class S who bears a strong resemblance to Haruka's idol, HAYATO. Tokiya claims to be HAYATO's identical twin brother and seems to bear a complex from being in his brother's shadow. He appears to be cold and aloof, as well as being a perfectionist. Later on, Tokiya reveals he is HAYATO, having enrolled into Saotome Academy to debut as himself from despising his image as HAYATO. He believes his voice is his strongest instrument, so his musical specialty is his vocals, although he can basically play almost any instrument.

 Ren is a student in Class S. He is the third son of the Jingūji family. He is flirtatious and affectionately calls Haruka "lady" and "little lamb." He, Masato and Ranmaru were childhood friends because they were all heirs to rich corporations, but stopped talking to each other after acknowledging their family status. As a child, his mother was an idol but died, causing his father to hide her work; however, Ren found a demo CD dedicated to him, inspiring him to become an artist. He plays the saxophone.

 Masato is a student in Class A. Raised in a strict, traditional environment, he is the oldest son and heir to the Hijirikawa Group. He, Ranmaru and Ren were childhood friends because they were all "heirs to rich corporations." He has a strained relationship with his father due to the fact that he has chosen to become an idol rather than the head of the Hijrikawa family. Masato is serious and has a conservative way of thinking, which causes him to clash with Ren at times. He plays the piano.

 Natsuki is a student in Class A. He has an extreme fondness for cute and small things, leading him to take a liking to Haruka and tease Syo. Natsuki has a split personality named  who appears when he takes his glasses off; as Satsuki, he is violent and cruel, but is more openly musically talented. While Natsuki is unaware of Satsuki at first, he remembers his actions later on in the series. He plays the viola.

 Syo is a student in Class S. Much to his chagrin, he has a short stature, but he is energetic, confident, and passionate. He idolizes Ryuya Hyuga and hopes to become like him. Syo has an identical twin brother, Kaoru, and in the game, Syo's heart condition continuously causes him to worry about him. In the anime, Syo briefly has a fear of heights, which is later remedied with help from the others and Mr. Saotome. He plays the violin.

 Cecil is the prince of Agnapolis who was cursed to turn into a black cat, who Haruka named Kuppuru. While he was a cat, he fell in love with Haruka. In the first game, he joins Saotome Academy after being freed of his curse. In Debut and the anime's second season, he is scouted by Saotome to be in the idol course. He is very cheerful, sensitive and later becomes the model of modesty and respect. He plays the flute.

Quartet Night
Quartet Night (stylized as QUARTET NIGHT) is a veteran idol group from STARISH's company who first appears in the 2013 game Uta no Prince-sama: All Star and the anime's second season, Uta no Prince-sama: Maji Love 2000%. The group acts as mentors to STARISH. The members are represented by the colors dark red for Ranmaru, lilac for Ai, emerald green for Reiji, and light blue for Camus.

 Reiji is 25 years old and becomes Otoya and Tokiya's mentor. He has a light-hearted personality and nicknames his friends. He also enjoys pulling pranks, especially on Ranmaru, who is the easiest target. Despite all this, he can become very serious and competitive when there is tension between him and his opponents. He plays the maracas.

 Ai is a 15-year-old robot who becomes Syo and Natsuki's mentor. He's very apt and hardworking, and often acts as the mediator whenever Camus and Ranmaru argue. He is very strict when it comes to his teaching, as his previous students quit after one month of training under him. In All Star, it is revealed that he is a clone of Aine Kisaragi, a former idol who disappeared years ago. He plays the synthesizer.

Ranmaru is 22 years old and becomes Masato and Ren's mentor. He loves rock and roll music, cats, and cooking, and can be bribed by the food that Reiji's family shop sells. In the game, he, Masato and Ren were childhood friends because they were all heirs to rich corporations, but Ranmaru's father lost all their fortune after he was betrayed by a colleague and died, so Ranmaru became an idol to pay the debt his father had caused. He plays the bass.

 Camus is a 21-year-old count from Permafrost who becomes Cecil's mentor in the anime. He appears to be two-faced and has a different on or off screen attitude. Camus gets into arguments with Ranmaru frequently and has no intentions to get friendly with people outside of work obligations. Camus takes a lot of notes and does a lot of research. He plays the cello.

HEAVENS
HEAVENS (stylized as HE★VENS) is the rival idol group of STARISH who briefly appears in the anime's second season, Uta no Prince-sama: Maji Love 2000%, before debuting again as a seven-member group in the final episode of the third season, Uta no Prince-sama: Maji Love Revolutions. They were established as recurring characters in the fourth season, Uta no Prince-sama: Legend Star. The group's name is an acronym of the members' names.

Eiichi is the leader of HEAVENS. His father, Raging Ōtori, is the group's manager. He was very impressed with Haruka's songwriting ability and wants her to become their producer.

Yamato is the younger brother of Ryuya Hyuga. Unlike Syo who idolizes Ryuya, Yamato resents him for constantly overshadowing him. He joined HEAVENS in order to surpass Ryuya.

Van has a flirtatious and brash personality. While he appears to be laid-back and uninterested in his idol work, he actually takes it very seriously when actually in the moment. He also fell in love with Haruka after he first heard her music, and in the anime is the only character to attempt asking her out on a date.

Eiji is Eiichi's younger brother. Unlike his brother and father, he has a shy and polite personality. He was asked to join HEAVENS by both his brother and father. Initially, he doubted this career choice but soon came to enjoy performing as an idol.

 Shion is quiet and has a mysterious personality. He was the last member to join HEAVENS.

Nagi is the youngest member of the group, being 13 years old. He tends to get a lot of compliments from fans and acts childish because of his cute appearance. He is called "Cutie Nagi" by fans. Despite his cute and innocent demeanor, he has a hostile personality.

Kira has a serious personality and is taciturn, leading to Nagi speaking for him. He was originally the heir of the Sumeragi Group. His father opposed him becoming an idol, but Kira went against him to pursue his music ambitions.

Supporting Characters

Saotome Academy

Tomochika is Haruka's best friend, classmate, and roommate. Her dream is to become a famous idol. She plays the electone and is 15 years old at the start of the series.

 Kaoru is Syo's younger twin brother. He attends Saotome Academy's sister school and studies to become a doctor.

Shining Saotome is the eccentric principal of the Saotome Academy, a prestigious idol school. He was a famous idol when he was younger, popular for the song . He has a habit of spying on students and popping up at random times to give advice. In Debut, it is revealed that he is Otoya's father, but covered up this fact to avoid scandals. His 14-year-old self, using his real name , appears as a love interest in Amazing Aria. He plays the bongos.

 Ringo is Class A's teacher. He is a male idol who crossdresses as a female because of his agency, and his biggest dream is to perform as a male idol. He plays the clarinet.

Ryuya is Class S's teacher and the older brother of Yamato Hyuga. He is an actor who Syo idolizes. He was formerly an idol, but he quit after his former partner, Haruki, died in a car accident. He plays the trumpet.

Raging Entertainment

Raging Otori is the president of Raging Entertainment who manages HEAVENS, in which both his sons, Eiichi and Eiji Otori are part of. Like Saotome, he was also a famous idol when he was younger, popular for the song "LOVE IS DEAD". He has an intimidating and harsh personality, fueled by his rivalry towards Saotome whom he is desperate to crush.

References

Uta no Prince-sama